Zora Kolínska (27 July 1941 – 17 June 2002) was a Slovak actress and singer. She studied at the Academy of Performing Arts in Bratislava (VŠMU). At the 1998 DOSKY Awards she won in the category of Best Actress, for her performances in the play Scény z Domu Bessemenovcov - Meštiaci.

Selected filmography 
 (television, 1978)
 (1984)
Albert (1985)
 (television, 1986)

References

External links

1941 births
2002 deaths
Slovak film actresses
Slovak stage actresses
Slovak television actresses
20th-century Slovak women singers
People from Liptovský Mikuláš District
20th-century Slovak actresses
Czechoslovak women singers